FC Sakhalin Yuzhno-Sakhalinsk is a Russian football club based in Yuzhno-Sakhalinsk, Russia, that competes in the FNL 2, the third tier of Russian football. The club was founded as FC Sakhalin-Tourist Yuzhno-Sakhalinsk in 2004 and changed their name to Sakhalin Yuzhno-Sakhalinsk in 2005.

History 
The club won the East zone of the Russian Professional Football League in the 2017–18 season, but did not apply for the license to the second-level Russian National Football League for 2018–19, refusing the promotion due to lack of financing. The same situation repeated in the 2018–19 season.

Domestic history

Current squad
As of 21 February 2023, according to the Second League website.

References

 
Association football clubs established in 2015
Football clubs in Russia
Sport in Yuzhno-Sakhalinsk
2015 establishments in Russia